Yury Zaitsev may refer to:

 Yury Zaitsev (weightlifter)
 Yury Zaitsev (politician)